The 1807 Massachusetts gubernatorial election was held on April 6, 1807.

Incumbent Federalist Governor Caleb Strong was defeated by Democratic-Republican nominee James Sullivan.

General election

Candidates
Caleb Strong, Federalist, incumbent Governor
James Sullivan, Democratic-Republican, incumbent Attorney General of Massachusetts

Results

Notes

References

1807
Massachusetts
Gubernatorial